Geovane da Silva de Souza (born 2 March 1999), simply known as Geovane, is a Brazilian footballer who plays as a midfielder for Ceará.

Club career
Geovane was born in Salvador, Bahia, Geovane played for  Grêmio, Palmeiras, Atlântico, Jacuipense and Ituano as a youth, before joining Ceará in 2020, initially for the under-23 squad. He made his first team debut on 1 March 2021, coming on as a second-half substitute for William Oliveira in a 1–1 away draw against ABC, for the year's Copa do Nordeste.

On 3 September 2021, Geovane renewed his contract until 2023. He made his Série A debut fifteen days later, starting in a 0–0 home draw against Santos.

Career statistics

References

External links
Ceará profile 

1999 births
Living people
Sportspeople from Salvador, Bahia
Brazilian footballers
Association football midfielders
Campeonato Brasileiro Série A players
Ceará Sporting Club players